Goggia rupicola, also known as the Namaqua dwarf leaf-toed gecko or the Namaqua pygmy gecko, is a southern African leaf-toed gecko first described by Vivian FitzSimons from a specimen collected on the 23 August 1937 where it was found in cracks of rocks of small outcrops in the arid Namakwaland in South Africa and Namibia.

Name
Rupicolous refers to inhabiting rocks and stones.\\

Description
On the dorsal (upper) sideG. rupicola is a dark greyish brown with pale salmon-coloured semicircular spots with a dark edge on the front arranged in more or less regular series down the back. A thin black streak runs from the nostril through the eye to just above ear-opening. The belly is a greyish white.

It is related to Goggia essexi from which it can be distinguished mainly by the dorsal and ventral scaling and the colour markings.

Dimensions: Body length about 30 mm, tail length 30 mm, head length 6 to 7 mm, head breadth 5.2 mm, forelimb 9 mm, hindlimb 12 mm.

Reproduction
The three elliptical-shaped  eggs originally collected in 1937 between Okiep and Springbok averaged 7.8 x 6.0 mm.

References 

Goggia
Reptiles of South Africa
Taxa named by Vivian Frederick Maynard FitzSimons
Reptiles described in 1938